The 2015–16 Biathlon World Cup – Mass start Men started on Sunday December 20, 2015 in Pokljuka and  finished on Sunday March 20, 2016 in Khanty-Mansiysk. The defending titlist is Anton Shipulin of Russia.

2014-15 Top 3 Standings

Medal winners

Standings

References

Mass start Men